Polychrysia splendida is a moth of the family Noctuidae. It is found in the Japan, Russia, Korea, northern Mongolia and recently also China.

The wingspan is 28–30 mm.

References

External links
Images

Plusiinae
Moths of Japan